Vailima is the name of a village about four miles south of Apia, the capital of Samoa. The population is 769. Vailima is part of the electoral political district Tuamasaga.

Origins 
The name Vailima means "water in the hand", according to an old Samoan tale. A woman gave some water (vai) in her hand (lima) to help her thirsty companion. A widely quoted misinterpretation states that the name means "five waters", as the word "lima" means both "hand" and "five" in Samoan.

Connections with Robert Louis Stevenson 
The village is most known as the location of the last residence of Robert Louis Stevenson, named "Villa Vailima", which is now the Robert Louis Stevenson Museum. The estate has had a varied past with it functioning further as the residence for the governor of German Samoa, the administrator of the New Zealand mandatory authority and the Samoan head of state. It is now a museum in honour of Stevenson and has been substantially restored.

Stevenson is buried in a tomb on Mount Vaea overlooking Vailima. He had two wishes for his burial, to be buried on the top of Mount Vaea and to be buried with his boots on as he used those boots to walk on the Samoan lands.

References

Populated places in Tuamasaga